Bharathiyar College of Engineering & Technology (BCET: French: Collège d'ingénierie et de technologie Bharathiyar) is a private engineering institute located in Karaikal, Puducherry India. The college is operated under the Sri Balaji Educational and Charitable Public Trust, and affiliated to Pondicherry University. BCET offers undergraduate and postgraduate courses in the fields of engineering and technology. All courses offered by BCET are approved by AICTE.

It is an engineering institution under the Shri Balaji Educational and Charitable Public Trust and founded by Shri M.K. Rajagopalan in 1997. It was the first self-financed technological institution of higher learning for the citizens of U.T. of Pudhucherry.

The Institution has implemented a quality management system as per the guidelines of ISO 9001-2008 and has been awarded ISO certification by TUV NORD. The college offers various undergraduate and postgraduate programs with the goal to turn out well-trained and dedicated young citizens to fill in the ranks of engineering profession with quality education. It has six departments namely Mechanical Engineering, Electronics & Communication Engineering, Electrical & Electronic Engineering, Computer Science & Engineering, Information Technology and Civil Engineering.

Campus

Facilities include seminar hall, cafeteria, health care, gym, hostel, sports and research facilities.

Courses 
The following courses are offered as a Bachelor of Technology:
Mechanical Engineering
Electronics & Communication Engineering
Electrical & Electronics Engineering
Civil Engineering
Computer Science & Engineering
Information & Technology

Additionally, the following courses are offered as a Master of Technology:
Computer Aided Design
Computer Science & Engineering
Power Electronics and Drives

A Master of Computer Applications is also offered with regular and lateral entry methods.

Karaikal district
Engineering colleges in Puducherry
Educational institutions established in 1997
1997 establishments in Pondicherry
Karaikal